He Jing or Jing He may refer to:

He Jing (engineer) (1934–2019), Chinese hydraulic engineer and politician
He Jing (TV presenter) (born 1969), Chinese television presenter
He Jing (canoeist) (born 1983), Chinese sprint canoeist
He Jing (table tennis), Malaysian table tennis player

See also
Ho Ching